WOBE (100.7 FM, "100.7 Radio Now") is a radio station broadcasting a top 40/CHR format. Licensed to Crystal Falls, Michigan, with studios in Iron Mountain, it first began broadcasting in 1999, carrying the Oldies Radio package from ABC Radio Networks.

History
On June 14, 2012 WOBE changed their format from classic hits (as B-100.7) to Top 40/contemporary hit radio, branded as "100.7 Radio Now".

Sources
Michiguide.com - WOBE History

References

External links

OBE-FM
Contemporary hit radio stations in the United States
Radio stations established in 1996